Tony Miles is an American professional poker player, originally from Ogden, Utah but now residing in Jacksonville, Florida. In 2018 he was runner-up at the World Series of Poker Main Event.

Miles attended Stadium High School in Tacoma, Washington and the University of North Florida. Prior to the Main Event, his largest career cash was for $18,000 at a WPT Regional Event in Jacksonville in 2011. He had two prior cashes at the WSOP, both in 2018. Miles suffered from alcohol and drug addiction in his past.

Miles qualified for the Main Event at bestbet Jacksonville. He entered the final table in third chip position and got to heads-up with John Cynn.

Miles was a contestant on American Ninja Warrior in 2019 and 2020.

As of 2018, his total live tournament winnings exceed $5 million.

References

External links
Hendon Mob profile
WSOP.com profile

Living people
American Ninja Warrior contestants
American poker players
University of North Florida alumni
People from Jacksonville, Florida
Year of birth missing (living people)